The Lika Cinema is a Croatian drama film directed by Dalibor Matanic. It was released in 2008.

Cast
 Krešimir Mikić as Mike
 Areta Ćurković as Olga
 Ivo Gregurević as Joso
 Danko Ljuština as Mike's father
 Jasna Žalica as Joso's wife
 Nada Gaćešić as Aunt
 Milan Pleština as Doctor
 Dara Vukić as Granny
 Marija Tadić as Jele
 Milivoj Beader as Iguman
 Damir Karakaš as Gliso
 Petar Tudja as Boy
 Trpimir Jurkić as Young Policeman
 Filip Radoš as Old Policeman
 Mirela Brekalo as Mike's mother

References

External links
 
 The Lika Cinema on Cineuropa

2008 films
2000s Croatian-language films
2008 drama films
Films directed by Dalibor Matanić
Croatian drama films
Films based on works by Croatian writers
Films based on short fiction